The contrabass trumpet is the lowest-pitched member of the trumpet family, sounding below the bass trumpet. A very rare novelty instrument, only a small number of instruments exist. It first appeared in the mid 20th century and has no orchestral or jazz repertoire. Usually built in 12' F a perfect fourth below the B♭ bass trumpet, it has the same length as the F contrabass trombone, cimbasso or tuba. Some (sometimes called the subcontrabass trumpet) are built larger in 18' B♭ an octave below the bass trumpet, two octaves below a standard B♭ trumpet.

History

A "contrabass trumpet" in 18' B♭ played by tuba player Don Butterfield appeared in 1962 on the TV show I've Got a Secret. The instrument was loaned to the show from a Claremont College University musical instrument collection, which is now at the Musical Instrument Museum in Phoenix, Arizona.

In 1967 Roger Bobo, tuba player with the Los Angeles Philharmonic, commissioned a contrabass trumpet from instrument maker George Strucel. Unhappy with the sound of the contrabass trombone in recording the Canzoni e Sonate by Gabrieli, they built an instrument in 12' F in the shape of a large bass trumpet, out of spare tubing and a bass trombone bell from the Bach factory.
Tuba player Carl Kleinsteuber made four similarly configured contrabass trumpets in F in the 1990s. He made them cheaply out of spare brass instrument parts as "fun" instruments, acknowledging the absence of any known repertoire.
In the early 2000s, Latvian trombonist Vairis Nartišs built four instruments in 18' B♭ which he called "subcontrabass trumpets", two of which are now in museums.

Performance 

Contrabass trumpets have not gained wide appeal, and very few instrument makers offer a contrabass trumpet today; Lars Gerdt in Sweden offers a model in F based on the Strucel/Bobo instrument.
Their unwieldy shape and weight can make contrabass trumpets difficult or impractical to play. The timbre from their cylindrical-bore construction, use of valves and similar range allow them to be readily substituted with a cimbasso.

References

Contrabass instruments
Trumpets